Aisake Nadolo (13 July 1964 – 30 July 2009) was a Fijian rugby union player. He played as lock.

Career
His first cap for Fiji was during the 1987 Rugby World Cup in the match against Italy, at Dunedin on 31 May, in the tournament he also took part at the quarter-final against France. He also was part of the 1991 Rugby World Cup roster, where he played just the match against Romania, at Brive-la-Gaillarde. His last cap for Fiji was during a match against Ireland, at Lansdowne Road, on 18 November 1995.

Notes

External links

Fiji international rugby union players
Fijian rugby union players
Rugby union locks
1967 births
2009 deaths
I-Taukei Fijian people